The Battle of Iquique was a naval engagement that occurred between a Chilean corvette under the command of Arturo Prat Chacón and a Peruvian ironclad under  Miguel Grau Seminario on 21 May 1879, during the naval stage of the War of the Pacific, that pitted Chile against Peru and Bolivia. The battle took place off the then-Peruvian port of Iquique. The ironclad  sank the Chilean wooden corvette , after four hours of combat, resulting in a Peruvian victory.

Background

The Bolivian government had threatened to confiscate and to sell the Antofagasta Nitrate & Railway Company, a mining enterprise with Chilean and British investors, by a decree on 1 February 1879. In response, the Chilean government sent a small military force which disembarked and seized control of the port of Antofagasta on 14 February. This event made Bolivian President Hilarión Daza declare war on Chile, and also forced Peru to honor a secret 1873 treaty with Bolivia. Although Peru tried to negotiate and to stop the imminent conflict, Chile, knowing of this pact, declared war on both Peru and Bolivia on 5 April. Another small Chilean force took control of the city of Calama after its victory in the Battle of Topater on March 23. From the beginning of the conflict, both sides clearly knew that control of the sea was the key to obtaining victory. Whichever country controlled the sea could freely transport troops and land them at any strategic point. So, during the first year of the war, Chilean strategy focused on destroying the Peruvian Navy.

In order to achieve this goal, the Chilean naval commander, Juan Williams Rebolledo, planned to sail north with his entire fleet, trying to engage the Peruvian Navy at Callao and achieve domination of the sea once and for all. The main ships of the Chilean Navy were sent towards the Peruvian port of Callao. Two old, wooden ships, the corvette  and the schooner Covadonga, commanded by Captains Arturo Prat and Carlos Condell respectively, were left blockading the Peruvian port of Iquique. However, as the Chilean Navy steamed north towards Callao, two ironclad ships of the Peruvian Navy steamed south from Callao, unseen. These ships were the monitor  and the armored frigate , commanded by Rear Admiral Miguel Grau (then a Captain), the commanding officer of the Peruvian Navy, and Captain Juan Guillermo More. The wooden corvette Esmeralda was constructed in 1854 in Henry Pitcher's shipyard, arriving in Valparaíso in 1856. This vessel was named Esmeralda after the frigate of the same name captured by Lord Cochrane at El Callao in 1820. Esmeralda displaced 854 tons, and was armed with twenty 32-pound cannons and two 12-pound cannons. In 1868, this was replaced with twelve 40-pound rifled cannons and four 40-pound Whitworth cannons. The Peruvian ironclad Huáscar was built in 1865 in the Laird Brothers' shipyard in Birkenhead, England.

Prelude

It was 21 May 1879, 6:30 in the morning, and the harbor was obscured by a thick marine fog. When the fog began to clear, Covadongas lookout shouted: "Smoke to the north!" but the crew was not able to identify the newly arrived ships. After a few moments, they concluded that it was the Peruvian squadron coming back. At 6:45 a.m., a sailor by Condell's side asked for the telescope, and in a moment of clarity, he observed the warships' rigging and said to Condell: "It's the Huáscar and the Independencia."
"What basis do you have to assert that?" asked Condell, and the sailor answered "From the shape of the platform on top of the foremast." Immediately Condell ordered a shot to be fired in the air to warn Esmeralda, still anchored in the port. The ships were indeed Independencia and Huáscar.

In that same moment, the Peruvian admiral Grau roused his crew:
"Crewmembers and Sailors of the Huáscar, Iquique is in sight, there are our afflicted fellow countrymen from Tarapacá, and also the enemy, still unpunished. It's time to punish them! I hope you will know how. Remember how our forces distinguished in Junin, the 2nd of May, Abtao, Ayachucho, and other battlefields, to win us our glorious and dignified independence, and our consecrated and brilliant laurels of freedom. No matter what the outcome, Peru will not fall. For our fatherland, Long Live Peru!"

Carlos Condell de la Haza warned Prat, and Commander Arturo Prat, seeing the difference between their forces and the enemies', ordered to hoist the signal: "reinforce the charge," "come to the talks," and "follow my waters" (follow his course) and then inspired the crew with the following words:

Lads, the struggle will be against the odds, but cheer up, and have courage. Never has our flag been hauled down in the face of the enemy, and I hope, thus, this will not be  the occasion to do so. For my part, as long as I live, this flag will fly in its place, and if I should die, my officers shall know how to fulfill their duties. Long Live Chile!

After the speech, Covadonga came to a halt, and Commander Prat then told the crews of Esmeralda and Covadonga led by Commander Condell: "For lunch people, strengthening loads, each to his duty!" Condell simply replied, "All right, sir!" A young ordering bugler at the same time was sounding the call to stations, and the Chilean crew then took their positions. After this everyone felt an explosion and a plume of water and foam up on the two ships; Huáscar had fired its first shot. The battle had begun. On land, people awoke to the first shot of Covadongas gun and went to the beach to get a first-hand look at the vessels coming to lift the blockade of the city.

Battle 

At 8:15, the first volley hit between the ships, and Prat ordered Esmeralda to start moving, followed by Covadonga. The transport Lamar was ordered (by Prat) to retreat to the south. At 8:25, a second volley fell and a shot from Huáscar hit fully on the starboard (right) side, passed through Esmeraldas side, killing the surgeon Videla, beheading his assistant, and mortally wounding another sailor. Condell changed his course and went behind Lamar. Grau ordered Independencia to block Covadonga and Lamars way. Prat observed Condell's action and asked himself: "What is Condell doing?" Condell ignored Prat's order and followed Lamar, but the warship did get away from Covadonga, and Independencia, under control of Juan Guillermo More, followed him. Independencia pursued Covadonga, while Huáscar finished Esmeralda. Prat quickly positioned the ship in front of the coast,  from it, forcing Huáscar to shoot with a parabolic trajectory to avoid hitting the Peruvian village, whose people gathered in crowds to see the battle. General Buendía, commander of the Peruvian garrison of Iquique, had artillery placed on the beach and sent an emissary in a fast rowing boat with a warning to Huáscar that Esmeralda was loaded with torpedoes. Grau stopped  from her and began shooting with the 300-pound cannons, not hitting her for an hour and a half, owing to the Peruvian sailors' inexperience in the handling of the monitor's Coles turret. The Chilean crew answered with their 30-pound cannons and gunfire, shots that rebounded uselessly on Huáscars plated armour. On the coast, the Peruvian Army garrison in the town installed a cannon battery manned by gunners and bombardiers, and began to attack the Chilean ship. A grenade reached her, killing three men. Prat order the warship to move, overexerting the engine and causing one of the boilers to explode. 

This move allowed Grau to see the absence of the torpedoes that supposedly filled Esmeralda. One of Huáscars shots hit directly on board, beheading the ordering bugler and mutilating the gun crews. The battle dragged on. The sailors from Huascar were very hard put to try and hit the Chilean corvette, seeing as, from Huascars point of view, their own countrymen and the Peruvian port were behind Esmeralda. Any missed cannon shot would very probably land among the population or batteries of the Peruvian port. Grau, seeing how useless it was to try to win the battle by exchange of cannon fire, and wanting to end the combat, ordered his ship to ram Esmeralda. Prat tried to avoid the blow by giving the rod forward and closing a port and managed to sidestep the blow to the mizzen mast height without further damage. When the ships collided, Huáscar was finally able to fire their 10-inch (300-pound) cannons at close range, causing the deaths of 40 or 50 sailors and marines. Prat, in a heroic gesture, tried to abandon his badly damaged ship and take over the enemy one. He would have shouted "Let's board, boys!" and jumped over the Peruvian ship, but without being followed by more than one countryman due to the noise of the combat. Then he would have been shot to death, while the one who boarded with him, Petty Officer Juan de Dios Aldea, would have been wounded. After the first ram, Esmeraldas situation was downright desperate. Grau wanted to give his opponents time to surrender. In Esmeralda Lieutenant Luis Uribe Orrego, by now the ship's acting Captain, then called an official meeting and decided not to surrender to the Peruvian Navy. While this was happening a sailor climbed the mizzen-mast to nail down the Chilean national flag, in order that the crew remember what Prat had said before the battle.

Grau was soon notified that the truce did not work again and decided to again ram Esmeralda, rushing at full speed on it, now for the starboard side. Uribe tried to maneuver like Prat and managed to present his side at an angle to spur the monitor Huáscar, but this time he opened a water route, entering pouring into the powder magazine and machines. The ship by then had a crew shortage and without more ammunition than he had on deck he could not mount an effective defense. Huáscar again fired guns at such close range that they killed several crew members including engineers and firemen who went up on deck and washed away the officers' mess room, which was then also the ship's clinic. Following Prat example in the first ram, Sublieutenant Ignacio Serrano boarded Huáscar with eleven more men, armed with machetes and rifles but they were again unsuccessful, falling on the deck of the monitor to the Gatling guns and the monitor's crew, some dying immediately due to bullet wounds sustained. Serrano was then the only survivor and had received several shot wounds in the groin. Grau quickly had him picked up and carried to the infirmary in a state of shock, where they left him next to the dying petty officer Aldea. Twenty minutes later Huáscar rammed Esmeralda a third time, this time in the sector of the mizzen mast accompanied by two guns. The corvette leaned forward and began to sink. While Esmeralda was sinking, the last cannon shot was fired by Midshipman Ernesto Riquelme. The Chilean flag was the last part of the warship to go underwater, still flying and nailed to the mizzen-mast. It was 12.10 pm at midday, and Grau realized that many Chilean sailors and marines (sources point out that 57 survived) were trying to avoid the suction of their sinking ship, and their captain had died hours before. 

Grau ordered boats to be lowered and for the enemy survivors to be rescued before they drowned. The Chilean sailors seeing the Peruvians maneuvering on Huascars deck thought at first they were going to be shot, but were very nonplussed when those who they thought were their murderers proved to actually be their saviors and picked them up, one by one. Independencia was in pursuit of Covadonga, which was heading south of the port of Iquique. Covadonga stuck close to the beach in the bay of Chiquinata, as Independencia had a deeper draft, until the latter came on to the rocks and shallow waters of Punta Gruesa and grounded. Commander Condell ordered an attack on Independencia which resulted in it being sunk and its crew fleeing using its lifeboats, with only 20 of its crew left. Condell ordered to shoot the survivors justifying his action because the Peruvian flag was still in the mast. The difference in attitude between the Chilean commander Condell and the Peruvian commander Grau is often noted by Peruvian maritime historians. He found Independencia stranded in the shallow water with 20 surviving crew members aboard, including More, since the rest had landed in boats on the shore. The Peruvian armored ship continued the pursuit of Covadonga for three hours until Miguel Grau, convinced that the distance that separated them it could not be shortened before sunset, he returned to the aid of Independencia. Grau estimated then that the loss of the frigate was complete and ordered the ship burnt after taking off the remaining crew.

Aftermath

After the battle, Rear Admiral Grau gave orders that Prat's personal effects (his diary, uniform and sword among others) were to be returned to his widow. When she received them, she also received a letter from the Peruvian flag officer describing the valor and bravery her late husband had shown during the engagement. In Chile, news reached the country via an underwater telegraph cable in Valparaiso. On Saturday, 24 May, the Chilean Navy General Staff and the Naval High Command convened a special meeting about the events in Iquique and Punta Gruesa on 21 May, and sent reports of the battles to the War Department in Santiago, resulting in a mass conscription draft being ordered in response. In the coming days many men enlisted into both the Army and the Navy, eager to honor the fallen and help the country win the conflict.

The Battle of Iquique was a clear Peruvian victory; the blockade on Iquique was lifted and Chilean forces temporarily left the area. However, Peru's loss of the Independencia, one of its most powerful warships, in the following battle of Punta Gruesa was strategically costly, while Chile only lost one of its oldest wooden warships. Also, Captain Prat's sudden death while on duty inspired thousands of Chilean youths to join the army and the navy. This is considered by Chilean historians to be one of the most important factors leading to the Chilean victory in the war. Years later, Prat became so embedded in the Chilean popular conscious that newspapers started to use the term "Pratiotism" to refer to "Patriotism". Since 1905, the date of the battle has been made a Chilean national holiday as Naval Glories Day (Dia de las Glorias Navales) and is honoured with celebrations all over the nation. However, it was not only Prat that was being honoured. Grau, now known as the "Gentleman of the Seas" due to his actions in the battle and later for his noble gesture toward Prat's widow and the surviving crewmembers, became honoured in both Peru and Chile as a gallant naval hero.

See also

Battle of Punta Gruesa
Battle of Angamos
Arturo Prat

References

Bibliography

 Farcau, Bruce W. (September 30, 2000). The Ten Cents War: Chile, Peru, and Bolivia in the War of the Pacific, 1879-1884, 
 Sondhaus, Lawrence (May 4, 2004). Navies in Modern World History, 

Iquique
Conflicts in 1879
History of Tarapacá Region
Iquique
Iquique
1879 in Chile
Iquique
May 1879 events